El Nuevo Diario was a Nicaraguan newspaper, with offices in the capital Managua.

History 
In 1980, the owner of La Prensa fired the editor Xavier Chamorro Cardenal. Eighty percent of the papers employees left with Chamorro Cardena due to La Prensa 's increasingly anti-Sandinista line and founded El Nuevo Diario.

As of 2010, El Nuevo Diario was one of the two major newspapers in Nicaragua (the other one was La Prensa).

El Nuevo Diario suspended its printed and digital editions on September 27, 2019.

References

External links
El Nuevo Diario website (Spanish)
 (Spanish)

1980 establishments in Nicaragua
Mass media in Managua
Daily newspapers published in Nicaragua
Nicaraguan Revolution
Publications established in 1980
Spanish-language newspapers
Defunct newspapers published in Nicaragua